Mick Herron is a British mystery and thriller novelist. He is the author of the Slough House series, early novels of which have been adapted for the Slow Horses television series. He won the Crime Writers' Association 2013 Gold Dagger award for Dead Lions.

Early life
Herron was born in Newcastle upon Tyne, England, and educated at Balliol College, Oxford, where he earned a degree in English.

Career

In 2003, he published his first novel, Down Cemetery Road. It was the first volume in a four-book series about Zoë Boehm, an Oxford private detective.

In 2010, he began a spy series titled Slough House, with first volume Slow Horses, featuring MI5 agents who have been exiled from the agency mainstream for various failures. The second volume in this series, Dead Lions, published in 2013, won the Crime Writers' Association 2013 Gold Dagger award. Herron has stated that the lead character, Jackson Lamb, was influenced by Reginald Hill's Andy Dalziel. , the series includes eight novels, plus several associated novellas, and events in related novels. Early volumes have also been adapted for television.

Slow Horses was published by Constable in 2010, but the firm declined the opportunity to publish the next book in the series in the United Kingdom due to disappointing sales of its predecessor. Soho published the Slough House novels in the United States, and John Murray started republishing the series in the UK from 2015.

Herron's short stories have been regularly published in Ellery Queen's Mystery Magazine and some are collected in the book, All the Livelong Day, published in 2013.

Bibliography

Zoë Boehm series
Down Cemetery Road (2003) 
The Last Voice You Hear (2004) 
Why We Die (2006)
Smoke and Whispers (2009)

The Slough House series (Jackson Lamb)
Slow Horses (2010)
Dead Lions (2013)
The List (2015 novella)
Real Tigers (2016)
Spook Street (2017)
London Rules (2018)
The Drop (US title: The Marylebone Drop) (2018 novella)
Joe Country (2019)
The Catch (2020 novella)
Slough House (2021)
The Last Dead Letter (2021 novella)
Bad Actors (2022)
Standing By The Wall (2022 novella)

Standalone novels
Reconstruction (2008)
Nobody Walks (2015)
This Is What Happened (2018)
The Secret Hours (expected 2023)

Although not part of the Slough House series, Reconstruction and Nobody Walks use some of the same characters and provide some character backstory. In story terms, Reconstruction is set before Slow Horses, whereas Nobody Walks comes after The List and before Spook Street.

Short story collections
All the Livelong Day (2013)
Dolphin Junction (2021)

Featuring five standalone crime fiction stories complemented by four mystery stories featuring  Zoë Boehm and Joe Silvermann. The collection also includes tales with Jackson Lamb of Slough House.

Standing by the Wall: The Collected Slough House Novellas (2022)

Includes all novellas in the Slough House series published as of 2022.

Adaptation 
The Slough House series has been adapted for television under the name Slow Horses, starring Gary Oldman as Jackson Lamb, with the first six-part season, based on the book Slow Horses, streamed on Apple TV+ from 1 April 2022. The second season, based on Dead Lions,  was filmed back-to-back with the first and premiered on 2 December 2022. It was announced in June 2022 that further seasons, adapting Real Tigers and Spook Street, had been greenlit.

Awards
 "Dolphin Junction"
 Joint winner, Ellery Queen Readers Choice Award 2009
 Slow Horses
 Longlisted for Ian Fleming Steel Dagger Award 2010
 Dead Lions
 Shortlisted for Barry Award 2014, for best thriller
 Shortlisted for Macavity Prize, 2014, for best novel
 Winner, CWA Gold Dagger for Best Crime Novel 2013
 Winner, Palle Rosencrantz Award 2020
Nobody Walks
 Shortlisted for Ian Fleming Steel Dagger Award 2015
 Real Tigers
 Shortlisted for Ian Fleming Steel Dagger Award 2016
 Shortlisted for CWA Gold Dagger for Best Crime Novel 2016
 Winner, Last Laugh Award, 2017
 Shortlisted, Theakston's Old Peculier Crime Novel of the Year 2017
 Spook Street
 Shortlisted for CWA Gold Dagger for Best Crime Novel 2017
 Winner, Ian Fleming Steel Dagger Award 2017, Spook Street
 Shortlisted, British Book Awards, Crime and Thriller Book of the Year 2018
 Shortlisted for Barry Award 2018, for best thriller
 Shortlisted, Theakston's Old Peculier Crime Novel of the Year 2018
 Winner, Last Laugh Award, 2018
 London Rules
 Shortlisted for CWA Gold Dagger for Best Crime Novel 2018
 Shortlisted for Ian Fleming Steel Dagger Award 2018
 Shortlisted, Last Laugh Award, 2019
 Shortlisted for Barry Award 2019, for best thriller
 Shortlisted, Theakston's Old Peculier Crime Novel of the Year 2019
 Winner, Capital Crime Best Thriller Award 2019
 Joe Country
 Shortlisted, Theakston's Old Peculier Crime Novel of the Year 2020
 Shortlisted for CWA Gold Dagger for Best Crime Novel 2020
 Slough House
 Winner, Theakston's Old Peculier Crime Novel of the Year 2022
 Winner, Last Laugh Award, 2022
 Shortlisted for Barry Award 2022, for best thriller

Personal life
Herron lives in Oxford. He enjoys playing squash.

References

External links
 
 Mick Herron Spybrary Podcast Interview
 Interview with Profile magazine|The dark(ly comic) side of MI5, Page by: Jim Sullivan – Profile

Living people
British male novelists
Crime Writers' Association
21st-century British novelists
English male novelists
21st-century English male writers
Writers from Newcastle upon Tyne
1963 births